Waterfall Bay is a bay in East New Britain Province, south-eastern New Britain, Papua New Guinea, at .

Bays of Papua New Guinea